Mike Kluge (born 25 September 1962 in Berlin) is a German cyclist. Kluge is a multiple German champion and amateur world champion in cyclo-cross in 1985 and 1987 and professional world champion in 1992.

In 1992 Kluge set up the bicycle manufacturing company Focus Bikes in Cloppenburg, Germany. He also competed in the men's cross-country at the 1996 Summer Olympics.

References

External links
 Mike Kluge's homepage

1962 births
Living people
Cyclo-cross cyclists
German male cyclists
Cyclists from Berlin
UCI Cyclo-cross World Champions (men)
Olympic cyclists of Germany
Cyclists at the 1996 Summer Olympics
German mountain bikers
20th-century German people